San Buenaventura Municipality is the second municipal section of the Abel Iturralde Province located in the La Paz Department in Bolivia. Its seat is San Buenaventura

Languages 
The languages spoken in the San Buenaventura Municipality are primarily Spanish and Quechua.

References 
 obd.descentralizacion.gov.bo

External links
 Map of Abel Iturralde  Province

Municipalities of La Paz Department (Bolivia)